Eilema simplex is a moth of the subfamily Arctiinae first described by Francis Walker in 1862. It is found in Myanmar and on Borneo.

References

simplex